Senator Danielson may refer to:

George E. Danielson (1915–1998), California State Senate
Jeff Danielson (born 1970), Iowa State Senate
Jessie Danielson (fl. 2010s), Colorado State Senate